Bahram Vand (also Romanized as Bahrām Vand; also known as Bahrāmvandī and Bahrām Vandī) is a village in Heydariyeh Rural District, Govar District, Gilan-e Gharb County, Kermanshah Province, Iran. At the 2006 census, its population was 322, in 66 families.

References 

Populated places in Gilan-e Gharb County